Tadeusz Teodorowicz (1931-1965) also known as Teo was an international speedway rider from Poland and Great Britain.

Speedway career 
Teodorowicz rode in the top tier of British Speedway from 1959-1964, riding for Swindon Robins. He was capped by both Poland and Great Britain and reached the final of the European Championship in 1956.

He would eventually become a British citizen after escaping and seeking political asylum from the communist East while on a tour of the Netherlands in September 1958. He spent four months in prison before gaining a Dutch passport and then moved to England. In England, he married Liliana Zajecka-Slonina, a local Swindon nurse of Polish origin. In 1963 he finished eighth in the British Championships, sealing a reserve spot at the final of the 1963 Individual Speedway World Championship. The following year he reached the final of the British Speedway Championship in 1964.

He was in the best form of his career at the time and then tragedy struck when he suffered major head trauma in a match while riding for Swindon Robins against West Ham Hammers. The match was held at the West Ham Stadium on 1 September 1964 and Teo was left with a skull fracture following a crash into the fence, this caused him to go into a coma. He was transferred to a London hospital and then moved to Swindon before he died several months later from Pneumonia, on 21 January 1965.

World final appearances

Individual World Championship
 1963 -  London, Wembley Stadium - Reserve - Did not ride

See also
Rider deaths in motorcycle racing

References 

1931 births
1965 deaths
British speedway riders
Polish speedway riders
Swindon Robins riders